Sarabjit (Sabi) Marwah (born July 12, 1951) is a member of the Canadian Senate. He is a former vice chairman and chief operating officer of Scotiabank, retiring in 2014 after 35 years with the bank where he began his career as a financial analyst. He has served on the boards of the C.D. Howe Institute, the Toronto International Film Festival, Torstar Corporation, Cineplex Inc., George Weston Ltd., Telus Corp. and the Hospital for Sick Children. He is also a founding member of the Sikh Foundation of Canada.

Marwah is Sikh and was born in India. He earned an undergraduate degree in economics at the University of Calcutta, a master's degree in economics at the University of Delhi, and an MBA from UCLA.

Marwah has an honorary doctorate from Ryerson University for his work in advancing social inclusion in business.

His appointment to the Senate was announced on October 31, 2016. He sits as a non-aligned senator.

References

Canadian senators from Ontario
Living people
Independent Canadian senators
Scotiabank people
Canadian Sikhs
Chief operating officers
Indian emigrants to Canada
Naturalized citizens of Canada
Canadian politicians of Punjabi descent
21st-century Canadian politicians
1951 births
Independent Senators Group